Faherty Brand is an American clothing company, founded by twin brothers Alex and Mike Faherty. Its aesthetic was described as "surf hippie" by The New York Times.

History
Before founding Faherty, Mike Faherty was employed by Ralph Lauren, while Alex Faherty worked in private equity at Cerberus.

They started the company to create a "perfect" board short. Swim trunks were the initial offering from Faherty Brand.

Faherty Brand debuted its first full clothing line in the summer of 2013.

Stores
Faherty Brand has a retail presence in cities including New York, Boston, and elsewhere.

References

External links

Clothing companies of the United States
Swimwear brands
Clothing companies established in 2013
2010s fashion